Nogometni klub Primorje, commonly referred to as NK Primorje or simply Primorje, was a Slovenian football club which played in the town of Ajdovščina. After Slovenia's independence in 1991, Primorje spent a total of 18 seasons in the Slovenian PrvaLiga until the club folded following the 2010–11 season when they were, due to high financial debt, unable to obtain competition licences issued by the Football Association of Slovenia. Their best league result was the second place in the 1996–97 and 2001–02 seasons.

A successor club was established in June 2011 under the name Nogometno društvo Ajdovščina.

Stadium

The team played their home matches at Ajdovščina City Stadium, a 1,630 capacity stadium in Ajdovščina. The stadium was renovated during the 2009–10 season, and was reopened in September 2010.

Honours
Slovenian PrvaLiga
 Runners-up: 1996–97, 2001–02

Slovenian Second League
 Winners: 2009–10

References

 
Association football clubs established in 1924
Defunct football clubs in Slovenia
1924 establishments in Slovenia
Association football clubs disestablished in 2011
2011 disestablishments in Slovenia